Sarah Andersen is an American cartoonist and illustrator, and the author of the webcomic Sarah's Scribbles.

Biography 
Andersen graduated from the Maryland Institute College of Art (MICA) in 2014. While attending MICA, she started drawing the semi-autobiographic webcomic Sarah's Scribbles (previously called Doodle Time). She won the Goodreads Choice Award in Best Graphic Novels & Comics three years in a row for Sarah's Scribbles. In 2016, she won the Goodreads Choice Award for her debut book, Adulthood is a Myth. She won in 2017 for her book Big Mushy Happy Lump and in 2018 for her book Herding Cats.

Andersen collaborated with the novelist Andy Weir on the graphic novel Cheshire Crossing, which was released in July 2019. Based on an earlier comic by Weir, the story follows Wendy Darling from Peter Pan, Dorothy Gale from The Wizard of Oz, and Alice Liddell from Alice's Adventures in Wonderland at a boarding school called "Cheshire Crossing."

In late 2019, Andersen began releasing a supernatural romance webcomic called Fangs on the Tapas platform. In September 2020, Fangs was published as a book by Andrews McMeel Publishing. It became a Publishers Weekly Bestseller that month and a New York Times Bestseller in October 2020.

In January 2020, Andersen painted a mural of her characters as part of a public art project in Mexico City, but it was graffitied over within days. On December 31, 2022, she authored a guest essay in the New York Times about the rise of artificial graphist systems such as Stable Diffusion, pointing out threats it presents on graphic creators such as increased confusion, appropriation, reputational impact, income reduction.

In January 2023, Andersen was listed as a plaintiff in a class action lawsuit against AI companies Stability AI, Midjourney, and online art community DeviantArt.

References

American women cartoonists
American webcomic creators
Living people
Maryland Institute College of Art alumni
Year of birth missing (living people)
American cartoonists
21st-century American women